High Moss Sarsfields Gaelic Football Club is a Gaelic Athletic Association club based in Derrytrasna, County Armagh, Northern Ireland. In addition to having numerous Gaelic football teams it is also a centre for Ladies' Gaelic football and other sports and activities. Sarsfields currently play in the Armagh Senior Football Championship and other Armagh GAA competitions.

History

The club was founded in 1926 and its highest achievement to date came in 1990, when it won the county Senior Football Championship, defeating Armagh Harps 0-09 to 0-06. It reached the final again in 1992, losing to Pearse Óg.

In 2007 the Men's Senior team was promoted to Division 2; the Ladies' team also won promotion. This returned the Senior team to Division One of the All-County League. In 2010, in their second season back in Division One, the Sarsfields lifted the Armagh Intermediate Football Championship title. Following a successful run in the IFC against Shane O'Neill's, Keady and Silverbridge, the Hoops defeated South Armagh side Cullaville Blues at Crossmaglen on 3 October; Sarsfields 1-15, Cullaville 0-11. Thomas McAlinden struck a goal within the opening 13 seconds of the game, possibly the quickest goal in any Armagh Championship Final. The Atty Hearty cup was lifted by captain Mark Reynolds.

Honours
 Armagh Senior Football Championship: (1)
 1990; Runners-up 1992
 Armagh Intermediate Football Championship: (2)
 1969, 2010
 Armagh Junior Football Championship: (1)
 1949

References

External links
Sarsfields Website

Gaelic games clubs in County Armagh
Gaelic football clubs in County Armagh
Hurling clubs in County Armagh